Valdena is a Frazione and village in Italy, that belongs to the comune of the town Borgo Val di Taro in the province of Parma, region Emilia-Romagna.

References 

Frazioni of the Province of Parma